John Henry Augustus Bomberger (January 13, 1817 in Lancaster, Pennsylvania – August 19, 1890 in Collegeville, Pennsylvania) was a German Reformed clergyman. He was president of Ursinus College, and did a translation and condensation of the Schaff–Herzog Encyclopedia of Religious Knowledge.

Biography
He graduated from Marshall College in 1837 and from Mercersburg Seminary in 1838, in which year he became a minister of the German Reformed Church. He was a pastor at Waynesboro, Pennsylvania, from 1840 to 1845; at Easton, Pennsylvania, from 1845 to 1854; and at the 1st Reformed Church (also known as the “Old Race Street Church”) of Philadelphia from 1854 to 1870. During the American Civil War, he was a radical abolitionist, and a firm supporter of the Union cause. In 1870, he became first president of Ursinus College, at Collegeville, Pennsylvania, which he had helped found.

Literary endeavors
He started a condensed translation of Herzog's Protestant Theological and Ecclesiastical Encyclopaedia, of which two volumes appeared (Philadelphia, 1856–58), corresponding to the first six volumes of Herzog's work.  Bomberger's work also incorporated information from other sources besides Herzog.  He also published Five Years at Race Street Church (1859), Kurtz's Text-Book of Church History (2 vols., 1860–62), The Revised Liturgy (1866) and Reformed not Ritualistic (1867).  He founded and edited the Reformed Church Monthly (1868-1876).

References

1817 births
1890 deaths
American Calvinist and Reformed ministers
Heads of universities and colleges in the United States
People from Lancaster, Pennsylvania
Franklin & Marshall College alumni
19th-century American clergy